Equipment of the Argentine Army lists weapons, vehicles, aircraft, and other materiel that either are in service or have served with the Argentine Army, since the early 1900s.

Totals for each item are estimated as per sources cited. Items not yet in service but planned for future use are listed in a separate section. Status (confirmed or presumed) of each item is one of the following:
 INS = in active service
 RSV = in reserve (not in active service, stored for eventual use)
 RET = retired (no longer in service or in reserve)
 TBC = to be confirmed (current status unclear)

Tanks

Armored vehicles

Utility vehicles

Artillery

Air defence systems

Anti-tank weapons

Small arms

Infantry equipment
Uniforms, and personal protection equipment
Uniforme de Combate Argentino (UCA): Battledress, standard uniform system (MultiCam)
U.S. Woodland: Battledress, locally manufactured. Will be replaced by UCA.
MARPAT: Battledress, Used by special forces.
MICH: Standard combat helmet. 
PASGT: Combat helmet. Will be replaced by MICH.
M1 helmet: Combat helmet, locally manufactured. Will be replaced by MICH.
Tactical and communication equipment
Harris Falcon III: Communications radio system.
Niro: Night vision device, locally manufactured. Used in FN FAL
Litton M949: Night vision device.
AN/PVS-4: Night vision device.
AN/PVS-5: Night vision device.
AN/PVS-7: Night vision device.
Mepro 21: Electro-optical sights. Used in modernized FN FAL.
EOTech: Electro-optical sights.
Grenades and mines
GME FMK-2 Mod. 0: Fragmentation hand grenade, locally manufactured.
M67 grenade: Fragmentation hand grenade.
FMK-1 mine: Plastic anti-personnel mine, 8 centimeters in diameter and 150 grams of explosive charge.
Expal P4B: Plastic anti-personnel mine, 8 centimeters in diameter and 180 grams of explosive charge.
FMK-3 mine: Plastic anti-tank mine, 24 centimeters in diameter and 6.5 kilograms of explosive charge.
FMK-5 mine: Metal anti-tank mine, 254 millimeters in diameter.
SB-81 mine: Plastic anti-tank mine, 24 centimeters in diameter and 2 kilograms of explosive charge.
FMK-1 Mod.0: Shaped charge, 2350 grams of TNT and 467 millimeters long.
FMK-3 Mod.0: Shaped charge, 5510 grams of TNT and 414 millimeters long.

Radars

Vessels

Engineers

Aircraft
The Argentine Army Aviation service operated since its creation in 1956 both fixed and rotary wing aircraft; these are detailed in a separate list for ease of maintenance.

See also 

Currently active military equipment by country

References

Notes

Citations

Further reading

External links 
  EQUIPAMIENTO DEL EJÉRCITO - Argentine Army official website  (accessed 2016-10-09)

Army Equipment
Argentine Army
Military equipment of Argentina
Argentine Army